Mitch Love (born June 15, 1984) is a Canadian former professional ice hockey left-winger, defenceman and current head coach of the Calgary Wranglers of the American Hockey League. Love played the role of both a pest and an enforcer during his hockey career. Averaging 3.4 penalty minutes a game over his entire career and posting a league leading 34 fights during the 2008-09 AHL season.

Career
Undrafted at the major junior level, Love was able to make the WHL's Moose Jaw Warriors for a pair of games in the 1999–00 season, before landing a full time role for the 2000–01 season. Later in his junior career he would play for the Swift Current Broncos and Everett Silvertips. Leading the league in penalty minutes and capturing a Broncos record during the 2002–03 season.

After going undrafted in the NHL, and aging out of the WHL, Love was signed to an entry level contract by the Colorado Avalanche, and joined their AHL affiliate, the Lowell Lock Monsters for the 2005–06 season. He bounced between AHL teams, spending one year each with the Albany River Rats, Lake Erie Monsters, Houston Aeros, and Peoria Rivermen, transitioning to playing left wing late in his AHL career.

On September 8, 2010, Love was signed as a free agent by the Bossier-Shreveport Mudbugs. of the CHL. After a single season with the Mudbugs, Love announced his retirement from playing to join the Western Hockey League's Everett Silvertips as an assistant coach on August 13, 2011.

After seven seasons as an assistant with the Silvertips, Love was hired as the head coach of the WHL's Saskatoon Blades for the 2018–19 season. After three seasons as head coach in Saskatoon he was hired by the Calgary Flames to be the head coach of their American Hockey League affiliate, the Stockton Heat (now the Calgary Wranglers) beginning with the 2021–22 season. Love captured the Louis A. R. Pieri Memorial Award as the leagues most outstanding coach during his first season with the Heat.

Career statistics

Coaching record

References

External links

1984 births
Living people
Albany River Rats players
Bossier-Shreveport Mudbugs players
Canadian ice hockey defencemen
Everett Silvertips players
Houston Aeros (1994–2013) players
Johnstown Chiefs players
Lake Erie Monsters players
Lowell Lock Monsters players
Moose Jaw Warriors players
Peoria Rivermen (AHL) players
Swift Current Broncos players
Canadian expatriate ice hockey players in the United States